Eremophila dichroantha, also known as bale-hook eremophila, is a flowering plant in the figwort family, Scrophulariaceae and is endemic to the south-west of Western Australia. It is a shrub with many ascending branches making the plant appear broom-like. It has small, hooked leaves and small, though abundant, violet to lilac-coloured flowers.

Description
Eremophila dichroantha is an erect shrub with many ascending branches which, although glabrous, have many raised glands.

The sepals are glabrous except for the long hairs on their edges, are sticky and remain on the plant long after flowering has finished. They are a shade of violet to lilac-coloured, rarely white on the outside and white with violet spots inside the tube. The petal lobes are hairy on the outside and have short, flattened hairs on the inside. The petal tube is mostly glabrous on the outside while the inside of the tube is filled with long, spidery hairs. The 4 stamens are fully enclosed in the petal tube.

Taxonomy and naming
The species was first formally described in 1904 by Ludwig Diels in Botanische Jahrbücher für Systematik, Pflanzengeschichte und Pflanzengeographie. The specific epithet (dichroantha) is derived from the Ancient Greek words δίχρως (díkhrōs) meaning “two-coloured” and ἄνθος (ánthos) meaning “flower”.

Distribution and habitat
This eremophila is widespread and locally common between Balladonia, Esperance and Lake King including the Cape Arid and Norseman areas in the Coolgardie, Esperance Plains and Mallee biogeographic regions.

Conservation status
Eremophila dichroantha is classified as "not threatened" by the Western Australian Government Department of Parks and Wildlife.

Use in horticulture
This eremophila is attractive with its arching branches and masses of blue to purple flowers in spring, followed by persistent sepals. It is difficult to grow from cuttings and seed but can be propagated more easily by grafting onto Myoporum rootstock. It will grow in most soils and in full sun or partial shade, is drought and frost resistant but should only be lightly pruned.

References

dichroantha
Eudicots of Western Australia
Plants described in 1905
Endemic flora of Western Australia
Taxa named by Ludwig Diels